The song is one of the five spirituals included in the oratorio A Child of Our Time, first performed in 1944, by the classical composer Michael Tippett.

"Nobody Knows the Trouble I've Seen" is an African-American spiritual song that originated during the period of slavery but was not published until 1867. The song is well known and many cover versions of it have been done by artists such as Marian Anderson, Lena Horne, Louis Armstrong, Harry James, Paul Robeson, and Sam Cooke among others. Anderson had her first successful recording with a version of this song on the Victor label in 1925. Horne recorded a version of the song in 1946. Deep River Boys recorded their version in Oslo on August 29, 1958. It was released on the extended play Negro Spirituals Vol. 1 (HMV 7EGN 27). The song was arranged by Harry Douglas.

Traditional lyrics
Nobody knows the trouble I've been through
Nobody knows my sorrow
Nobody knows the trouble I've seen
Glory hallelujah!

Sometimes I'm up, sometimes I'm down
Oh, yes, Lord
Sometimes I'm almost to the ground
Oh, yes, Lord

Although you see me going 'long so
Oh, yes, Lord
I have my trials here below
Oh, yes, Lord

If you get there before I do
Oh, yes, Lord
Tell all-a my friends I'm coming to Heaven!
Oh, yes, Lord

Variations
 The song appeared as "Nobody Knows The Trouble I've Had" in 1867 in Slave Songs of the United States with additional verses.
 The Jubilee Singers sang a song with a similar chorus and with different tune and lyrics, entitled "Nobody Knows the Trouble I See," first published in 1872. 
 The second line ("Nobody knows my sorrow") or fourth line is changed in some renditions to be "Nobody knows but Jesus".
 The song appears in the disc of the year 1973 "Mocedades 5" of the Spanish group Mocedades.

Classical variations

In the late 19th century African-American music began to appear in classical music art forms, in arrangements made by Black composers such as Samuel Coleridge-Taylor, Henry Thacker Burleigh and J. Rosamond Johnson. Johnson made an arrangement of "Nobody Knows the Trouble I See" for voice and piano in 1917, when he was directing the New York Music School Settlement for Colored People.

American violinist Maud Powell was the first white solo concert artist to perform classical arrangements of spirituals in concerts, and that is where she also interpreted classical and contemporary pieces by composers like Dvorak and Sibelius. After Powell's suggestion, J. R. Johnson made an arrangement of "Nobody Knows the Trouble I See" for piano and violin in 1919. Powell got to play this in a fall program she organized, and then she died that November. Recent interpretations of the classical version of this spiritual have been made by a Chicago violinist, Rachel Barton Pine, who has been working along the lines of Powell's legacy.

In popular culture

 The song is one of the five spirituals included in the oratorio A Child of Our Time, first performed in 1944, by the classical composer Michael Tippett.
 The song is sung by an offscreen chorus in the 1944 race film Go Down, Death!.
An African American soldier during the second episode of Roberto Rossellini's Paisan (1946) sings this song to a little Italian boy.
In the movie Young Man With A Horn (1950), the song is played at the memorial service for the character Art Hazzard. 
Bing Crosby included the song in a medley on his album 101 Gang Songs (1961).
In the Bonanza episode "The Smiler" (1961), a portion is sung by Herschel Bernardi (Arthur Bolling), and Hy Terman (Jud).
The song is sung on a background radio in episode 1 of the Doctor Who TV serial The Evil of the Daleks (1967), when the Second Doctor and Jamie McCrimmon are in a coffee bar. It was a cover version performed by The Seekers.
In his Jazz album of 1978,  Ry Cooder added the couplet "Nobody knows the trouble I see, Nobody knows but me" based on the song, as an opening to his version of Nobody, originally composed and sung by Bert Williams.
Balki Bartokomous sings a line from the song in Season 2 Episode 5 (1986) of Perfect Strangers.
Part of the song was sung by Princess Vespa in the cult movie Spaceballs (1987). In this version, the lyric is changed to "Nobody know the trouble I've seen / Nobody knows but Jesus".
In the film Police Academy 4: Citizens on Patrol (1987), Lt. Proctor sings this song in prison while running a metal cup along the bars.
A 1988 issue of Boys Life had a comic strip about a Boy Scout called Pee Wee Harris. In it, the Scouts are doing a community project for Eagle Scout in which they are cleaning up an old jailhouse in order for it to be converted into a museum. The title character, Pee Wee Harris, thanks the other Scouts for their hard work and says he can finish up. However, as he is about to quit one of the cells shuts on him. The final panel shows nighttime on the old jailhouse, and "Nobody knows the trouble I've seen" being sung from one window.
In the pilot episode of The Fresh Prince of Bel-Air (The Fresh Prince Project, 1990), the main character, Will Smith, plays it on the piano.
In the Wee Sing video "Wee Sing in the Big Rock Candy Mountains" (1991), the song is sung by Little Bunny Foo Foo to express his sorrow after he is turned into a goon by the Good Fairy for repeatedly bopping the Meecy Mice. He sings a verse of the song again in "Wee Singdom: The Land of Music and Fun " (1996) when he temporarily forgets the next part of his performance song "Going on a Bunny Hunt".
An episode of Space Cats had the cats investigating why a popular and beloved clown had gone bad, to learn he was replaced by an impostor. The heroes find the real clown imprisoned in a villain's dungeon, where he is crying and singing the song to himself.
In The Lion King (1994), Zazu briefly sings the song to Scar while under captivity.
A line of the song is used in the Dexter's Laboratory episode "Dee Dee Be Deep" (1997)
The song was sung in the Recess episode "The Voice" (1998) by actor and singer Robert Goulet who performed it as Mikey's singing voice.
In the children's adventure game Freddi Fish 3: The Case of the Stolen Conch Shell (1998), Luther's Uncle Blenny sings two bars of the song woefully while unlawfully imprisoned.
In Freddi Fish 4: The Case of the Hogfish Rustlers of Briny Gulch (1999), Luther sings one bar of the song when Freddi and Luther are locked up in a jail.
The line "Nobody Knows the Trouble I've Seen" is used to end the second verse of "You Know What They Do to Guys Like Us in Prison" (2004) by My Chemical Romance.
Part of the song was sung in the first verse of "Monument" (2007) by A Day To Remember.
In Season 5 Episode 16 "Subway, Somehow" (2010) of the sitcom "The New Adventures Of Old Christine", it is sung by Christine Campbell (Julia Louis-Dreyfus) while she is stuck in a subway station.
The song can be heard on a radio in Silent Hill: Downpour (2012).
The first verse of the song is sung by Chloe James in the season 2 episode "I Want My Nikki Back, Nikki Back, Nikki Back" of Dog With a Blog while trying to stop Stan from ruining and sabotaging dinner. 
In Episode 10 "Shopping" (2013) of season 1 of The Goldbergs, it is sung by Bevery Goldberg locked up in a mall jail.
In Episode 10 "Murdoch in Ragtime" (2014) of season 7 of Murdoch Mysteries, it is sung in the opening sequence, along with Careless Love. 
Dr. John covered the song on his album Ske-Dat-De-Dat: The Spirit of Satch (2014).
A quote from the song is used as the opening quote of "Nobody Knows the Trubel I've Seen" (Episode 63, 2014) of the TV show Grimm.
Line 1 & 2 was sung in the show Tyler Perry's House of Payne in Volume 9.
In the episode of The Muppet Show featuring John Denver, Denver responds to some mushroom-shaped Muppets by singing "Nobody knows the truffles I've seen!"
Rich Hall's BBC Four documentary Rich Hall's the Dirty South features the song sung by The Dixie Hummingbirds.
The song is played on a theremin by Sheldon Cooper in the TV show The Big Bang Theory.
In Rick and Morty S4: Ep.7, Promortyus, Rick and Morty are put in prison by face hugging aliens. Morty sings the first line of the song, referencing "Do you remember that song Rick, from when the prisoners sing it?"

See also 
Christian child's prayer § Spirituals

References

External links
 Louis Armstrong playing the song (1962)

African-American cultural history
African-American spiritual songs
Gospel songs
Louis Armstrong songs
Songs about depression